Phillpott is a surname. Notable people with the surname include:
 Jane Philpott (born 1960), Canadian politician and physician
 Scott Phillpott, US Naval captain
 Andrew Phillpott, founder of the band Das Shadow

See also
 Philpott (disambiguation)
 Phillpotts
 Philpot (disambiguation)